Mission—Coquitlam  was a federal electoral district in British Columbia, Canada, that was  represented in the House of Commons of Canada from 1988 to 1997.

This riding was created in 1987 from parts of Mission—Port Moody riding.

It was abolished in 1996 when it was merged into Dewdney—Alouette riding.

It consisted of: 
 the Dewdney-Alouette Regional District;
 the part of Coquitlam District Municipality lying east of the Coquitlam River;
 the part of the City of Port Coquitlam lying north and east of the Canadian Pacific Railway right-of way.

Members of Parliament

Election results

See also 

 List of Canadian federal electoral districts
 Past Canadian electoral districts

External links 
Riding history from the Library of Parliament
 Website of the Parliament of Canada

Former federal electoral districts of British Columbia